The 1816 special elections for Maryland's 5th congressional district were to fill two separate vacancies. The 5th district was a plural district, with two seats.  Both seats were vacated, the first by Representative Nicholas R. Moore (DR) in 1815, before the 14th Congress even met, and the second by Rep. William Pinkney (DR) on April 18, 1816 after being named Minister to Russia.

Election results

January election
The first special election was held on January 27, 1816 to replace Moore.

Smith took his seat in the 14th Congress on February 4, 1816.

September election
The second election was held on September 3 to fill the vacancy left by Pickney's resignation.

Little took his seat on December 2, 1816, at the start of the Second Session.

See also
List of special elections to the United States House of Representatives
 1816 and 1817 United States House of Representatives elections

References

Maryland 1816 05
Maryland 1816 05
1816 05
Maryland 05
United States House of Representatives 05
United States House of Representatives 1816 05